This is a list of winners and nominees of the Primetime Emmy Award for Outstanding Short Form Comedy or Drama Series. The category was initiated in 2016 alongside Outstanding Short Form Variety Series and Outstanding Short Form Nonfiction or Reality Series. The awards replaced the now-retired category for Outstanding Short-Format Live-Action Entertainment Program. In 2021, this award will be merged Short Form Variety Series to form the Primetime Emmy Award for Outstanding Short Form Comedy, Drama or Variety Series. These awards were not presented at the Primetime Emmy Awards show, but at the Creative Arts Emmy Award show.

Winners and nominations

2010s

2020s

Programs with multiple awards
Totals include wins for Outstanding Short Form Comedy, Drama or Variety Series.

3 awards
 Childrens Hospital

2 awards
 Between Two Ferns with Zach Galifianakis

Programs with multiple nominations
Totals include nominations for Outstanding Short Form Comedy, Drama or Variety Series.

5 nominations
 Childrens Hospital

3 nominations
 Between Two Ferns with Zach Galifianakis
 Hack Into Broad City
 The Daily Show: Correspondents Explain
 30 Rock: The Webisodes

2 nominations
 An Emmy for Megan

Total awards by network
 AMC – 2
 Adult Swim – 1
 CBS on Snapchat – 1
 Sundance – 1

Notes

References

Short Form Comedy or Drama Series
Awards disestablished in 2020
Awards established in 2016